Alex Kuznetsov and Mischa Zverev were the defending champions, but Zverev chose not to compete.
Kuznetsov partnered with Denys Molchanov but lost to eventual champion Samuel Groth  and John-Patrick Smith in the semifinals, who also defeated Carsten Ball and Peter Polansky in the final.

Seeds

Draw

Draw

References
 Main Draw
 Qualifying Draw

Knoxville Challenger - Doubles
2013 Doubles